Lwanda is a settlement in Kenya's Western Province.

References 

Populated places in Western Province (Kenya)
Vihiga County